German submarine U-300 was a Type VIIC/41 U-boat of Nazi Germany's Kriegsmarine during World War II.

The submarine was laid down on 9 April 1943 by the Bremer Vulkan yard at Bremen-Vegesack as yard number 65. She was launched on 23 November 1943, and commissioned on 29 December 1943 under the command of Oberleutnant zur See Fritz Hein. U-300 served with the 8th U-boat Flotilla for training, the 7th U-boat Flotilla from 1 August 1944 to 30 September 1944 and the 11th U-boat Flotilla from 1 October 1944 to 22 February 1945 for operations. She carried out three patrols, sinking two ships, and damaged two more before she was sunk on 22 February 1945 off Quarteira, Portugal.

Design
German Type VIIC/41 submarines were preceded by the heavier Type VIIC submarines. U-300 had a displacement of  when at the surface and  while submerged. She had two shafts and two  propellers.

U-300 was fitted with five  torpedo tubes (four fitted at the bow and one at the stern), fourteen torpedoes, one  SK C/35 naval gun, (220 rounds), one  Flak M42 and two  C/30 anti-aircraft guns. The boat had a complement of between forty-four and sixty.

Service history

First patrol
U-300 departed Horten Naval Base, Norway, on 18 July 1944 and sailed for the waters south-east of Iceland. On 4 August the U-boat was attacked by a Canso flying boat of No. 162 Squadron RCAF with three depth charges, causing extensive damage. The U-boat drove the aircraft off with flak, but was forced to return to base for repairs, arriving at Trondheim on 17 August.

Second patrol
The U-boat left Trondheim on 4 October 1944 for another patrol south of Iceland. On 10 November she sank two ships from convoy UR-142 en route from the UK to Reykjavík in Iceland.

She hit the British 6,017 GRT tanker Shirvan setting her on fire, and when the Icelandic 1,542 GRT cargo ship Godafoss stopped, against orders, to pick up survivors from the tanker, she was also torpedoed, and sank within seven minutes with the loss of 24 lives, including four young children. The abandoned Shirvan foundered the next day.

U-300 returned to Stavanger, Norway on 2 December.

Third patrol
U-300 sailed from Stavanger on 21 January 1945 on her third and final patrol to the Atlantic waters off Spain. There on 17 February, 27 miles from Gibraltar, she attacked Convoy UGS-72, firing two spreads of two torpedoes, hitting the American 7,176 GRT Liberty ship Michael J. Stone and the British 9,551 GRT tanker Regent Lion.

The Michael J. Stone was flooded in both holds and the steering room. However, she managed to reach Gibraltar under her own power where she was dry-docked and repaired. The Regent Lion, which had already been damaged by a torpedo from another U-boat the previous day, had to be taken in tow. She was grounded on Perl Rock, a mile south of Carnero Point in the Bay of Gibraltar, and was later declared a total loss.

Sinking
Nine of the crew were lost, there were 41 survivors.

Summary of raiding history

References

Bibliography

External links

German Type VIIC/41 submarines
U-boats commissioned in 1943
U-boats sunk in 1945
World War II submarines of Germany
World War II shipwrecks in the Atlantic Ocean
1943 ships
Ships built in Bremen (state)
U-boats sunk by British warships
U-boats sunk by depth charges
Maritime incidents in February 1945